Al Jemailiya is a town  in the municipality of Al-Shahaniya, Qatar. It used to be the seat of Al Jemailiya Municipality before it was incorporated into Al Rayyan Municipality in 2004. In 2014, the town was incorporated into the newly-created Al-Shahaniya Municipality. The town is situated roughly 30 km north-west of the Al-Shahaniya Exit of Dukhan Highway. It has been designated a District Centre for Al-Shahaniya Municipality, meaning that it is being developed to serve the needs of nearby communities, such as Al Suwaihliya.

Etymology
The name derives from the Arabic word 'jamila', which means 'beauty'. It was so named because of its relative abundance of vegetation.

Various alternative transliterations of the name exist, such as Al Jumaliyah, Lijmiliya, Al Gummaylah and Al Jumaylīyah.

Geography

Al Jemailiya is in north-west Qatar. The village of Al Qa'iya is to the north-east.

The town is made up of two adjacent villages which formed around the Al Jemailiya well. Transport between the two sections is facilitated by Al Jemailiya Road and Lebsayyer Road. The two villages are:
Al Jemailiya Al Naeem, the northern section which was named after the Na'im tribe.
Al Jemailiya Al Shahwan, the southern and main section which was named after the Shahwan tribe.

History
In J.G. Lorimer's 1908 publication Gazetteer of the Persian Gulf, he makes mention of "Jimalīyah" as a nomadic outpost situated "16 miles east-north-east of the foot of Doḩat Faishshākh". He stated that the inhabitants received good water from a masonry lined well at a depth of 18 fathoms.

As part of an initiative by the government to provide housing for residents of rural areas, 60 new houses were built in Al Jemailiya in 1980.

Al Jemailiya was incorporated in Al-Shahaniya Municipality after the municipality was formed from parts of Al Rayyan Municipality in 2014.  According to the Ministry of Environment, there were about 75 total households within the town limits in 2014.

Al Jemailiya Municipality

In the 2004 census, when Al Jemailiya was a municipality, it was recorded as having administered Al Utouriya, Al Jemailiya (town), Umm Bab, Al Nasraniya, and Dukhan.

When it was a municipality, it bordered the following municipalities:
Al Ghuwariyah - north
Al Khawr - northeast
Umm Salal - east
Ar Rayyan - southeast
Jariyan al Batnah - south

In 2004, Al Jemailiya Municipality was merged with Al Rayyan Municipality.

Municipality demographics
The population of Al Jemailiya Municipality:

In the 2004 census, out of a municipal population of 10,303, the number of Muslims amounted to 6,782, Christians amounted to 965, and the remaining 2,566 inhabitants identified as following other religions.

The following table is a breakdown of registered live births by nationality and sex for Al Jemailiya. Places of birth are based on the home municipality of the mother at birth.

Visitor attractions

Mosques
There are a number of mosques dating to the mid-20th century in the town. As a result of mass migration to the capital Doha over the years, most mosques were deserted.

Bin Duham Mosque, erected in 1942, is one of the few dilapidated mosques in Al Jemailiyah. It has two entrances on the north and south side, respectively. The minaret, in the north-east section, lies on a thin base and is barrel-shaped. An outdoor prayer area is accessible through four pathways in the courtyard, while the prayer hall has three entrances leading from the outdoor area. The roof covering the prayer areas was constructed using plaited reed mats overlain with a mixture of mud and straw.

Another old mosque in the village is Al Suwaheet Mosque, which was constructed in 1940. It has two entrances in the east and south, respectively. The outdoor prayer area can be accessed through five rectangular pathways in the courtyard. There is also an indoor prayer hall.

The oldest and smallest mosque is Al Amiri Mosque. Opened in 1939, it continued to remain in operation after the abandonment of the other mosques. It has a southern and northern entrance. The minaret is small and has a narrow base with no ornamental markings. There are outer and inner prayer areas. The mosque has undergone a number of renovations in its history, resulting in its roof being overlain with corrugated metal and concrete block pathways being created for the open prayer area.

Culture

Al Jemailiya Youth Center was opened on 17 June 1996. Among the activities it organizes are Quran recitation, educational seminars and lectures, courses in information technology, and artistic pursuits such as painting classes and theatrical productions. It offers association football facilities and exercise equipment, and occasionally organizes and hosts local sports tournaments. Classes in Nabati poetry, also known as "Bedouin poetry", are also held here.

Health
As part of the Ministry of Municipality and Environment's Al Azab program to help improve the healthcare for livestock, a modern veterinary clinic was opened in the town.

Qatar National Master Plan
The Qatar National Master Plan (QNMP) is described as a "spatial representation of the Qatar National Vision 2030". As part of the QNMP's Urban Centre plan, which aims to implement development strategies in 28 central hubs that will serve their surrounding communities, Al Jemailiya has been designated a District Centre, which is the lowest designation.

Development in Al Jemailiya is oriented towards developing public services and constructing more mixed-use buildings so that it may serve the needs of nearby settlements. Some of the proposals include opening a themed retail complex and establishing a farmers' market. Among the buildings to be constructed as part of the plan are a 4,159 m² civil defense centre, a similarly sized primary health care centre with emergency facilities, and a 22,278 m² youth centre.

Education
The following schools are in Al Jemailiya:

References

Populated places in Al-Shahaniya